Ghufran Azam was an Indian politician, elected to the Lok Sabha, the lower house of the Parliament of India as a member of the Indian National Congress.

References

External links
Official biographical sketch in Parliament of India website

India MPs 1980–1984
Lok Sabha members from Madhya Pradesh
Rajya Sabha members from Madhya Pradesh
1943 births
2015 deaths
Indian National Congress politicians from Madhya Pradesh